Stanislav Anatolyevich Larionov (born June 20, 1976, Leningrad, USSR) - Russian futsal player and Coach of MFK CPRF Moscow.

Biography 
Larionov began his professional career in 1999 at the club MFK Saratov, where he played a little more than one season. Then Stanislav returned to his native St. Petersburg, where for some time he represented the club Yedinstvo.

Soon, however, the team ceased to exist, and he continued his career in the Ekaterinburg club Finpromko-Alpha under Yuri Rudnev. Larionov took part in the sensational victory of the Ural club in the Russian Cup in 2001. It was on account of his winning goal against Moscow  Dina  in the final match. Soon after Finpromko-Alpha won the European Futsal Cup Winners Cup, and Stanislav contributed significantly with two goals in the semi-finals.

Despite the successes,  Finpromko-Alpha  soon ceased to exist, and Larionov thereafter played two seasons in Kazan  Privolzhanin. Then he was invited to play for Rudnev in Moscow at Dynamo, where he also spent two seasons. During this time he became a two-time Russian Futsal Super League and won another Cup of Russia. He also noted the four goals in the draw UEFA Futsal Cup 2004/05, when Dinamo were finalists of the tournament.

After leaving Moscow club Stanislav played for MFK Norilsk Nickel, Gazprom-Ugra Yugorsk, Dinamo-2,and the summer of 2010 he returned to his native St. Petersburg, becoming the player of  Polytech. In early 2012 he moved on loan to the Moscow  Dina.

Achievements   

  Championship Russian mini-football  (2): 2005, 2006 
 Owner of   Russian Cup on mini-football  (2): 2001, 2004 
 Recopa Cup 2002

References

External links
 Profile Online AMFR

1976 births
Russian men's futsal players
Sportspeople from Saint Petersburg
Living people